Rani Honnamma is a 1960 Indian historical drama film in Kannada language, directed and written by K. R. Seetharama Sastry and produced by Karibasaiah. The film stars Rajkumar and Leelavathi.

Cast 
 Rajkumar
 Leelavathi as Honnamma
 Lalitha Rao
 M. Jayashree
 Narasimharaju as Manjanna
 Balakrishna
 M. N. Lakshmi Devi
 Papamma
 G. V. Iyer

Soundtrack 
The music for the film was composed by Vijaya Bhaskar and lyrics for the soundtrack penned by Ku. Ra. Seetharama Shastry. The songs "Haarutha Doora Doora" and "Jeevana Hoovina Haasige" were received very well and considered one of the evergreen hits in Kannada film industry.

Track list

References

External links 

 Songs at Raaga

1960 films
1960s Kannada-language films
Indian biographical drama films
Films set in the 19th century
History of India on film
Films scored by Vijaya Bhaskar
1960s biographical drama films
1960s historical drama films
Indian historical drama films
Films directed by K. R. Seetharama Sastry
1960 drama films